This page shows the results of the Weightlifting Competition at the 1999 Pan American Games, held from July 23 to August 8, 1999, in Winnipeg, Manitoba, Canada. There were a total number of fifteen medal events, eight for men and seven for women.

Men's competition

Flyweight (– 56 kg)

Featherweight (– 62 kg)

Lightweight (– 69 kg)

Middleweight (– 77 kg)

Light-heavyweight (– 85 kg)

Middle-heavyweight (– 94 kg)

Heavyweight (– 105 kg)

Super heavyweight (+ 105 kg)

Women's competition

Flyweight (– 48 kg)

Featherweight (– 53 kg)

Lightweight (– 58 kg)

Middleweight (– 63 kg)

Light-heavyweight (– 69 kg)

Heavyweight (– 75 kg)

Super-heavyweight (+ 75 kg)

Medal table

See also
Weightlifting at the 2000 Summer Olympics

References
 Sports 123
 Queensland Results 

Pan American Games
1999
Events at the 1999 Pan American Games